Broberg is a surname. Notable people with the surname include:

Beinta Broberg (1667–1752), historical female figure from the Faroe Islands
Gunnar Broberg (1942–2022), Swedish professor of History of Science and Ideas at Lund University, Sweden
Gustaf Broberg (1885–1952), Swedish rower who competed in the 1912 Summer Olympics
Jan Broberg Felt (born 1962), American actress, singer and dancer
Karin Broberg (born 1973), Swedish geneticist and professor at Karolinska Institutet and Lund University, Sweden
Lily Broberg (1923–1989), Danish stage and film actress
Pete Broberg (born 1950), American former professional baseball player
Philip Broberg (born 2001), Swedish professional ice hockey player
Thomas Broberg, senior engineer for Volvo in Gothenburg, Sweden